Donnithorne is a surname. Notable people with the surname include: 

Audrey Donnithorne (1922–2020), British-Chinese political economist and missionary
Don Donnithorne (1926–2016), New Zealand architect
Eliza Emily Donnithorne (1821–1886), Australian woman
John Donnithorne Taylor (1798–1885), member of the Taylor-Walker brewing family
Vyvyan Donnithorne (1886-1968), Archdeacon of Western Szechwan